Mozzali Andrea (Guastalla 1895 - Poviglio 1977) was an Italian sculptor, restorer and painter.

Biography 
He was a student and collaborator of Alceo Dossena in Parma and Accademia di Belle Arti di Roma and with his teacher he worked as sculptor in Mossina palace (ex Ducal Palace of Guastalla )   and for other commissions. He created busts of historical figures, such as Ferrante Gonzaga, Isabella di Capua, Lucrezia Borgia, and commemorative monuments, such as the one for dead soldiers of the Great War in San Girolamo di Guastalla. After taking part in World War I, he married and  settled in Guastalla in Martyrs of Belfiore street where in 1933 he founded, with friends, artists and writers, the "Pia cantina di San Francese". In 1939 he presented his works at the 1st Art Exhibition at the Technical Institute of Guastalla. In the interwar years he devoted himself to restoration, classical sculpture and cemetery tombstones for churches in the province of Reggio Emilia and Brescia. In the second half of the 1940s his beloved son Guido, who was also one of Ligabue's best friends, died. His life was marked by a sincere friendship with Antonio Ligabue who recognized to him only  the title of "friend" in fact in 1941 Mozzali hosted him in his home in Guastalla and took on the responsibility of getting him out of the psychiatric hospital. Ligabue could have instinctively approached sculpture but it was Andrea Mozzali, an incredible master of every plastic technique, who encouraged if not initiated him to sculpture.

Artwork 
His production can be divided into four periods: up to the '30, his works are academic, influenced by his master Alceo Dossena; in the following decade he devoted himself above all to the creation of sculptures for funeral and religious commissions.     Follows a period in which his paintings show the influence of the Renaissance masters. Since the mid-1950s he devoted himself to create popular paintings and sculptures using a poor artistic language. As an acute observer of the world, he focused his attention on lively village reality without renouncing to insert in his cartoonistic and grotesque works a charge of irony but not sarcasm.     His last production differs from the naive way for the variety of the themes treated and the cultured and humanist spirit with which he creates his witty and pungent scenes in a critical mood of observation of human nature in an attempt to enhance and preserve those feelings that have been and will be the basis of human life in their universality, as did Hieronymus Bosch and Pieter Bruegel the Elder many centuries ago.

Works 
 "Band concert in a square". Oil on canvas. Suzzara (MN), Galleria Civica d'Arte Contemporanea.
 "Male portrait". Drawing on card. National museum naives Cesare Zavattini, Luzzara (RE).
 "Child". Limestone sculpture. National museum naives Zavattini, Luzzara  (RE).
 "Monuments for dead soldiers of the Great War". San Girolamo di Guastalla (RE).
 "Via Crucis in modeled terracotta". Church of Bobbio  (Piacenza).
 "Bronze mask of Antonio Ligabue on his tomb". Cemetery of Gualtieri  (RE).
 "Terracotta reliefs and marble statues of saints on the facade". Chiesa dei Santi  Filippo e Giacomo, Guastalla (RE).
 "Ferrante I Gonzaga triumphant over Envy", bronze statue, Civic Gallery, Guastalla (RE).
 "Landscape", Oil on canvas, Galleria d'arte moderna Aroldo Bonzagni, Cento (FE).
 "Interior", Oil on canvas, Pinacoteca civica  "M. Moretti",  Civitanova Marche Alta (MC).
 "Two  kneeling angels in adoration of the Cross", marble rilief for the tomb of Francesco Scaravelli, Guastalla  Cemetery.
 "Butcher", Oil on canvas.

References

1895 births
1977 deaths
20th-century Italian painters
20th-century Italian sculptors
20th-century Italian male artists
Italian male painters
Naïve painters
People from Guastalla